The Koch–Ahom conflicts (1543–68) refer to the rivalry between the Koch and the Ahom kingdoms over the control of the Brahmaputra Valley.  The conflict began with Nara Narayana ascending to power and consolidating his hold over the western portion; and it ended with the failure of Chilarai's campaign against Sulaiman Karrani.  This was followed by an alliance  that soon gave way to a fierce conflict between the Ahoms and the Mughals.

Notes

References

 

Ahom kingdom
Kingdoms of Assam
History of Cooch Behar
1540s in India
1550s in India
1560s in India
1540s conflicts
1550s conflicts
1560s conflicts